A Seer (also sihr) is a traditional unit of mass and volume used in large parts of Asia prior to the middle of the 20th century. It remains in use only in a few countries such as Afghanistan, Iran, and parts of India although in Iran it indicates a smaller unit of weight than the one used in India.

India

In India, the seer was a traditional unit used mostly in Northern India including Hindi speaking region, Telangana in South. Officially,  seer was defined by the Standards of Weights and Measures Act (No. 89 of 1956, amended in 1960 and 1964) as being exactly equal to 1.25 kg (2.755778 lb). However, there were many local variants of the seer in India. Note the chart below gives maund weight for Mumbai, divide by 40 to get a seer.

Aden, Nepal and Pakistan
In Aden (Oman), Nepal, and Pakistan a seer was approximately 0.93310 kg (2.057 lb) derived from the Government seer of British colonial days.

Afghanistan
In Afghanistan, it was a unit of mass, approximately 7.066 kg (15.58 lb).

Persia/Iran
In Persia (and later Iran), it was and remains in two units. 
 The metric seer was 74.22 g (2.618 oz)
 The seer (sihr) was 160 g (5.64 oz)

The smaller weight is now part of the national weight system in Iran and is used on daily basis for small measures of delicate foodstuff and choice produce.

Sri Lanka
In Sri Lanka, it was a measure of capacity, approximately 1.86 pint (1.024 litres)

See also
List of customary units of measurement in South Asia

References

Units of mass
Units of volume
Customary units in India
Obsolete units of measurement